Francesca Buller (born 20 January 1964) is an English actress best known for her portrayal of various characters in the TV series Farscape, most notably that of War Minister Ahkna. She also has performed in theatre roles, including in Hamlet and Merchant of Venice.

Buller is married to fellow actor Ben Browder, who played John Crichton in Farscape and Cameron Mitchell in Stargate SG-1. They met while they were studying at the Central School of Speech and Drama in London.

Buller was nominated for Best Special Guest Television in Bad Timing for the SyFy Genre Awards.

Filmography
 Heatstroke (2008) ... Dr. Taggert
 Farscape: The Peacekeeper Wars (2004) (TV film) .... War Minister Ahkna
 Kiss of a Killer (1993) (TV)
 Chaplin (1992) .... Minnie Chaplin
 Those Secrets (1992) (TV)
 Deceived (1991) .... Lillian
 Fever (1991/I) (TV) .... Denise
 She's Been Away (1989) (TV) .... Hospital Nurse

Notable TV guest appearances
 Farscape playing "Minister Ahkna" in  "Bad Timing" (episode No. 4.22) 21 March 2003
 Farscape playing "Minister Ahkna"  "We're So Screwed Part III: La Bomba" (episode No. 4.21) 14 March 2003
 Farscape playing "Minister Ahkna"  "We're So Screwed Part II: Hot to Katratzi" (episode No. 4.20) 7 March 2003
 Farscape playing "Minister Ahkna"  "Bringing Home the Beacon" (episode No. 4.16) 7 February 2003
 Farscape playing "Raxil"  "Scratch 'n Sniff" (episode No. 3.13) 20 July 2001
 Farscape playing "ro-NA"  "Look at the Princess Part II: I Do, I Think" (episode No. 2.12) 28 July 2000
 Farscape playing "ro-NA"  "Look at the Princess Part I: A Kiss is But a Kiss" (episode No. 2.11) 21 July 2000
 Farscape playing "M'Lee"  "Bone to Be Wild" (episode No. 1.21) 21 January 2000
 Father Dowling Mysteries playing "Gloria"  "The Royal Mystery" (episode No. 3.1) 20 September 1990

External links
Francesca Buller-Online 

Francesca at Snurcher's Guide

1964 births
English film actresses
Place of birth missing (living people)
English television actresses
Alumni of the Royal Central School of Speech and Drama
Living people
Actresses from Los Angeles
21st-century American women